Cryptopalpus is a genus of bristle flies in the family Tachinidae. There are about 15 described species in Cryptopalpus.

Species
These 15 species belong to the genus Cryptopalpus:

 Cryptopalpus aequabilis (Walker, 1849) c g
 Cryptopalpus discalis (Brèthes, 1909) c g
 Cryptopalpus diversus (Walker, 1849) c
 Cryptopalpus harpezus Reinhard, 1952 c g
 Cryptopalpus histrix (Rondani, 1863) c g
 Cryptopalpus marginalis (Brèthes, 1909) c g
 Cryptopalpus metallicus Curran, 1947 c g
 Cryptopalpus nigricornis (Townsend, 1914) c g
 Cryptopalpus nigriventris (Macquart, 1843) c g
 Cryptopalpus ornatus (Macquart, 1843) c g
 Cryptopalpus ruber (Townsend, 1915) c
 Cryptopalpus rufiventris (Macquart, 1846) c g
 Cryptopalpus semiater (Schiner, 1868) c g
 Cryptopalpus transiens (Walker, 1849) c g
 Cryptopalpus transversus (Walker, 1853) c g

Data sources: i = ITIS, c = Catalogue of Life, g = GBIF, b = Bugguide.net

References

Further reading

External links

 
 

Tachinidae